Initially the Bush Presidency asserted that they did not have to release any of the Guantanamo captive's documents.  They asserted that no captive apprehended in Afghanistan was entitled to the protections of the Geneva Convention, and that those held in the Guantanamo Bay Naval Base were not protected by US law either, because it was not on US territory.

This position was widely criticized, and was challenged in the United States's Judicial System, with several cases eventually being heard before the Supreme Court of the United States.  In Rasul v. Bush the Supreme Court overruled the Executive Branch, and clarified that the United States District Courts had jurisdiction to hear detainees' suits for writs of habeas corpus.

By September 2007 Eleven official lists have been released.  Many captives names were spelled inconsistently on these lists.

Document preparation

One of the results of the Rasul v. Bush ruling was the creation of the Office for the Administrative Review of Detained Enemy Combatants (OARDEC).  OARDEC was responsible for the implementation of a one time Combatant Status Review Tribunal (CSRT) and annual Administrative Review Board (ARB) hearings.

The CSR Tribunals and ARB hearings structure was modeled after the Tribunals described in Army Regulation 190-8 (AR 190-9), but with different mandates.

The mandate of the AR 190-8 Tribunals is to fulfill the USA's Geneva Convention obligation to give captives a "competent tribunal"—authorized to make a determination as to whether the captive is a "privileged belligerent" entitled to the Conventions protections, an innocent civilian, who should be immediately released, or a combatant who has violated the laws of war.  According to the Geneva Conventions only combatants who a competent tribunal, like the AR 190-8 Tribunals, has determined are combatants who have violated the laws of war can be tried for hostile acts.

The CSR Tribunals mandate is to make a determination as to whether the Guantanamo captives had been correctly determined to have been "enemy combatants".

The ARBs mandate is to annually review each captive's case and make a recommendation as to whether the USA has a continuing reason to hold the captive.

Eventually close to ten thousand pages of documents prepared for captives CSR Tribunals and ARB hearings.

CSRT unclassified dossiers

179 Guantanamo captives had the unclassified documents prepared for their Combatant Status Review Tribunals (CSRT) released to their lawyers.  In 2005 the Associated Press hosted 58 of these unclassified CSRT dossier.

Documents released in 2005

In response to a Freedom of Information Act (FOIA) request from the Associated Press the United States Department of Defense released 507 or the 558 Summary of Evidence memos prepared for the captives' CSR Tribunals.

List of captives

The DoD challenged another FOIA request from AP, for a list of the captive's names, and the transcripts from their Tribunals.  The DoD did not challenge this request on national security grounds.  The DoD declined to release these documents, and based their refusal by arguing that they were concerned for protecting the captives' privacy.

In January 2006 US District Court Justice Jed Rakoff, the judge who was considering the Department of Defense's arguments dismissed the DoD's arguments, and gave the DoD a deadline of 6pm Friday, March 3, 2006.  The DoD did deliver a CD, with approximately 5,000 pages of documents, in 60 large portable document format files on March 3, but they didn't make the 6pm deadline.  Even so, they sent a military courier to retrieve the disk they had delivered late, and replace it with a more limited one.

The documents the DoD released were incomplete.  While several dozen transcripts contained the captives names, because they had spelled them out, because they said their documents bore the wrong name, all the other documents were identified only by their Internee Security Number.

The DoD released updated versions of some of the original 60 pdf files, released another 16 files containing transcripts from the first annual Administrative Review Board hearings. On April 20, 2006 released a list of the names, nationalities and ISNs of the 558 captives whose cases were considered by CSR Tribunals.

This made it possible to tie the 300+ transcripts identified solely by an ISN with individual captives.

On May 15, 2006 the DoD released a list of the names, nationalities, ISN, date of birth, and place of birth, of all the 759 captives who had been held in Guantanamo.

Habeas Corpus documents

Thousands of pages from captives habeas corpus requests have been made public.

Military Commission charge sheets

In 2004 four captives faced charges before the first version of the Guantanamo military commissions.  The charge sheets against these men were made public.

In 2005 a further five captives faced charges, before the second version of the military commissions.  Their charge sheets were also made public.

In 2006 one more captive faced charges before the second version of the military commissions.

In July 2006 the Supreme Court ruled, in Hamdan v. Rumsfeld, that the Bush Presidency lacked the constitutional authority to establish military commissions.  It ruled that only the United States Congress had the authority to establish the commissions.

In the fall of 2006 Congress passed the Military Commissions Act of 2006.  This act established a third version of the military commissions.  Three of the original ten captives who had faced charges under the earlier versions of the commissions had new charges filed under the new version.  These charges were also made public.

14 "high value detainees"

On September 6, 2006 President Bush transferred 14 "high value detainees" who had been held in secret CIA black sites.  They were the first transfers since Rasul v. Bush.

Another five new captives were transferred in the year that followed.

September 10th, 2007 releases

The DoD quietly released nine new lists and 112 pdf files containing new documents, or new versions of previously released documents.

Non-combatant release

In late 2004 and early 2005 OARDEC's recommendations that thirty-eight captives had not been enemy combatants in the first place was confirmed by the Designated Civilian Official.

In 2006 the Washington Post could only confirm the names of 30 of the 38 men.

On November 19, 2007 the Department of Defense published an official list of the 38 men's names.

References

Guantanamo Bay captives legal and administrative procedures